Olive quick decline syndrome (OQDS) (in Italian: Complesso da Disseccamento Rapido dell'Olivo, CDRO or CoDiRo) is a wasting disease of olive trees which causes dieback of the leaves, twigs and branches so that the trees no longer produce crops of olives.  The main cause is a strain of the bacterium, Xylella fastidiosa, which is spread by plant-sucking insects such as the meadow froghopper.  The bacteria restrict the flow of sap within the tree and so choke its extremities.


Impact 
The disease particularly affects olive groves in Southern Italy. It was first detected in Italy in 2013, in the Salento Peninsula; by late 2013, it was estimated that approximately 8,000 hectares were affected. As of 2020, the disease was threatening olive groves and oil production in Italy, Greece, and Spain, which together account for 95% of European oil production. One 2020 model predicts a potential economic impact of the disease for Italy over 50 years between 1.9 billion to 5.6 billion Euros.

In addition to Europe, the disease has also been detected in olive crops in California, Argentina and Brazil.

Symptoms 
Symptoms include leaf scorch and desiccation of twigs and branches, beginning at the upper part of the crown and then moving to the rest of the tree, which acquires a burned look.

References

 Bacterial plant pathogens and diseases
Olives